Flight of the Storks is a 2012 French English-language action thriller miniseries directed by Jan Kounen and based on Jean-Christophe Grangé's 1994 novel of the same name.

Plot
Jonathan Anselme, a young English academic, teams up with Max Böhm, an amateur ornithologist, to follow storks on their migration from Switzerland to Africa. Max wants to find out why some birds never return from this journey. However, after Max is found dead in mysterious circumstances, Jonathan decides to make the trip alone, never suspecting that he will find himself caught up in an international web of intrigue. While the Swiss detective Dumaz investigates Max Böhm’s murky past, Jonathan is forced to confront his own troubled history. He uncovers a trail of grisly murders travelling through Bulgaria, Turkey, the Middle East, the Congo along the pathway of the migrating storks and their deadly secret.

Cast
 Harry Treadaway as Jonathan Anselme
 Rutger Hauer as Sonderman
 Perdita Weeks as Sarah Gabbor
 Clemens Schick as Hervé Dumaz
 Danny Keogh as Max Böhm
 Richard Lukunku as Gabriel
 Antoine Basler as Marcel Minaus
 Amr Waked as Doctor Djuric
 Grant Swanby as Hank

Production 
Shooting commenced in October 2011. Flight of the Storks was shot in South Africa, Istanbul and across Europe.

References

External links
 Official website for Flight of the Storks
 

2010s French television miniseries
Canal+ original programming